Taylor Saghabi (born 25 December 1990) is an Australian-born Cook Islands professional footballer with heritage from Lebanon and Cook Islands, who plays as an attacking midfielder for Cook Islands national football team.

Career 
The attacking midfielder played for Parramatta FC, Hills United FC, Parramatta Eagles, Manly United FC, Blacktown City Demons, Sydney Olympic FC and Dulwich Hill FC in the youth, as well on senior side for Titikaveka F.C., Puaikura F.C., West Ryde Rovers.

International 
Saghabi made his debut for the national team on 27 August 2011 in a 4–0 loss against Papua New Guinea. He played in 10 games and scored 6 goals for the Cook Islands national football team.

Career statistics

International

Statistics accurate as of match played 4 September 2015

International goals
Scores and results list. Cook Islands's goal tally first.

Notes

References

External links
 

Living people
1990 births
Association football midfielders
Cook Islands international footballers
Cook Island footballers
Soccer players from Sydney
sydney Olympic FC players